Runt is the self-titled debut album of the band Runt, commercially released September 1970. Runt was a trio consisting of Todd Rundgren (guitars, keyboards, vocals), Hunt Sales (drums), and Tony Fox Sales (bass). The entire album was written and produced by Rundgren, formerly of Nazz, and he performed most of the instruments. Many regarded Runt as Rundgren's debut solo album, and later reissues credit the album to Rundgren rather than to the group.

The album features the single "We Gotta Get You a Woman", which reached  20 on Billboards Hot 100 in January 1971. A month later, the album peaked at  185 on the Billboard 200.

Recording
The first album recording session was at I.D. Sound in Los Angeles with Electric Prunes singer Jim Lowe engineering. Rundgren then moved the project to New York City's Record Plant, with Jack Adams engineering. All voices and most instruments were performed by Rundgren, with occasional contributions from Runt members Hunt and Tony Sales, along with various session musicians including Rick Danko, Levon Helm, Mark Klingman, John Miller, and three members of the American Dream. The album was mixed at the first Record Plant in New York, the second Record Plant in Los Angeles, and Jack Clement Studio in Nashville. Mastering was by Sterling Sound in New York.

Releases
Ampex Records first issued the album in 1970 as a promotional release with 10 tracks, intended only for radio deejays. The general public release was in September. The single "We Gotta Get You a Woman" entered the Billboard Hot 100 at  92 in mid-November 1970, then climbed to its peak of  20 at the end of January 1971.

Ampex decided to press more copies of the LP in November 1970. A 12-track master of the LP, which Rundgren had rejected in favor of a second mix, was accidentally sent to the pressing plant, resulting in approximately 5,000 mis-presses, which were sold despite the mistake. There was also an 11-track version which has the standard 6 tracks on Side One and 5 tracks on Side Two featuring The full length version of "Baby Let's Swing" and "Say No More". This version may have been pressed in even smaller numbers. This album as well as Runt: The Ballad of Todd Rundgren were issued in 1971 on the Bearsville label, being distributed by Ampex at the time. In mid-1971 Bearsville was purchased by Warner Bros. distribution, and plans were made to re-release each album with Runt as catalog number BV 2046 and Ballad as BV 2047. These were never pressed. Later in 1973 Warner Bros urged Bearsville to re-release both albums as a "twin pack" entitled Todd Rundgren's Rack Job (Catalog number 2BV 2156). The album got as far as test presses and album art but was shelved, as Rundgren preferred to release an album of new material instead.

Track listing
All songs by Todd Rundgren.
Side one
"Broke Down and Busted" – 4:32
"Believe in Me" – 2:04
"We Got to Get You a Woman" [styled "We Gotta Get You a Woman" as a single and on Bearsville pressings] – 2:52
"Who's That Man" – 2:59
"Once Burned" – 2:09
"Devil's Bite" – 3:53

Side two
"I'm in the Clique" – 4:57
"There Are No Words" – 2:12
"Baby Let's Swing"/"The Last Thing You Said"/"Don't Tie My Hands" – 5:28
"Birthday Carol" – 9:14

12-track mispressed vinyl release, November 1970
Side one
"Broke Down and Busted" – 4:59 (same as standard version but with short intro from "There Are No Words")
"Believe in Me" – 2:01 (alternate mix)
"We Gotta Get You a Woman" – 3:07 (alternate mix)
"Once Burned" – 2:09 (same as standard version)
"Who's That Man?" – 2:59 (same as standard version)
"Hope I'm Around" – 4:28 (not on standard version, but an alternate version was included on his second album)
"Devil's Bite" – 3:58 (alternate mix with extended guitar solo)

Side two
"I'm in the Clique" – 4:57 (same as standard version)
"There Are No Words" – 2:12 (same as standard version)
"Baby Let's Swing" – 3:25 (full length song, not part of a medley)
"Say No More" – 3:08 (not on standard version)
"Birthday Carol" – 9:11 (partially the same as standard version, but with some brief alterations)

There were also two early issues on cassette with alternate track listings. The first issue was the 1970 Ampex release which reverses Sides One and Two of the LP, in order to sequence the longer side first. The second issue was the 1971 Bearsville Ampex release which has a radically different track listing as well as edited versions of "Devil's Bite", "Broke Down and Busted", "I'm in the Clique", "There are No Words", "Birthday Carol" and has the medley split in two.

Expanded reissue
In 2011 reissue label Edsel released an expanded twofer of Runt and Runt: The Ballad of Todd Rundgren that included the eight long-out-of-print alternate versions of songs from the 12-track misprint as bonus tracks. In 2014, Edsel issued Runt + The Alternative Runt, a double CD set that contained the original Runt on the first disc, the November 1970 misprint on the second disc, and "Broke Down and Busted (live at Carnegie Hall, June 8, 1972)" as a bonus track.

Personnel
Todd Rundgren – production, arrangements, all instruments and voices except where indicated
Tony Sales – bass (except on "Once Burned", "I'm in the Clique", and "Birthday Carol"), percussion on "We Got to Get You a Woman" and "Devil's Bite"
Hunt Sales – drums (except on "Once Burned", "I'm in the Clique", and "Birthday Carol"), percussion on "We Got to Get You a Woman" and "Devil's Bite"
Rick Danko – bass on "Once Burned"
Levon Helm – drums on "Once Burned"
Mark Klingman – electric piano on "I'm in the Clique"
John Miller – bass on "I'm in the Clique"
Bobby Moses – drums on "I'm in the Clique"
Don Lee van Winkle – rhythm & acoustic guitar on "Birthday Carol"
Don Ferris – bass on "Birthday Carol"
Mickey Brook – drums on "Birthday Carol"

Charts
Album

Singles

References

Todd Rundgren albums
1970 debut albums
Albums produced by Todd Rundgren
Ampex Records albums
Rhino Entertainment albums
Bearsville Records albums